Leone Barbaro (born 20 October 1993) is an Italian lightweight rower. He won a gold medal at the 2017 World Rowing Championships in Sarasota with the lightweight men's four.

Achievements

References

1993 births
Living people
Italian male rowers
World Rowing Championships medalists for Italy